Aortic plexus may refer to:
 abdominal aortic plexus
 thoracic aortic plexus